Ofer Dekel is a computer science researcher in the Machine Learning Department of Microsoft Research. He obtained his PhD in Computer Science from the Hebrew University of Jerusalem and is an affiliate faculty at the Computer Science & Engineering department at the University of Washington.

Areas of research
Dekel's research topics include machine learning, online prediction, statistical learning theory, and stochastic optimization. He is currently engaged in the application of machine learning techniques in the development of the Bing search engine.

Bibliography

h-index
, Ofer Dekel has an h-index of approximately 18, above the mean for computer scientists.

Highly cited publications
Below is a select list of publications in descending order of citations

See also
Bing
Jubatus
Machine learning
Statistical learning theory
Stochastic optimization

References

External links 

Hebrew University of Jerusalem School of Computer Science & Engineering alumni
Living people
Machine learning researchers
Microsoft employees
University of Washington faculty
Year of birth missing (living people)